Vitamin Enhanced is a 6-disc box set by English psychedelic rock band Ozric Tentacles. It compiles the band's six first recordings, originally released in the 1980s.

The first six albums were originally released on cassette, handmade by the band, and only sold at festivals and concerts. In 1993, the albums were transferred to CD, and the compiling box set was first released in November 1993 through the band's independent record label, Dovetail Records. The original pressing was limited to 5,000 copies. Not much later, the box set was withdrawn due to complaints from food company Kellogg’s, since they alleged the design of the box was too similar to their Corn Flakes one. It remains unknown how many box sets were sold before the withdrawal, but since then, the original 1994 box set has become a rare collectors' object .

All six albums were re-released as independent CD copies in 2000 by Snapper Music, going quickly out of print. In 2013, to celebrate the band's 30th anniversary, the original six albums were remastered for the reissue of the Vitamin Enhanced box set, released through Snapper Music in January 2014. In 2021, the six albums were once again remastered and released as a deluxe box set with a 48-page book.

Track listing

CD 1: Erpsongs (1985)

CD 2: Tantric Obstacles (1985)

CD 3: Ethereal Cereal (1986)

CD 4: There Is Nothing (1987)

CD 5: Sliding Gliding Worlds (1988)

CD 6: Bits Between the Bits (1989)

References

1994 compilation albums
Ozric Tentacles albums